Bathpool Park is a public park in a rural area between Newcastle-under-Lyme and Kidsgrove, Staffordshire (near the border with Cheshire).  The park became  notorious in 1975 as the location for the murder of Lesley Whittle. Lesley's body was found hanging from a steel wire at the bottom of a shaft in the park. Lesley fell or was pushed by a killer known as the Black Panther, Donald Neilson. Neilson was sentenced to life for Whittle's and four other murders, eventually dying as a prisoner in December 2011.

In 1977, a feature film about Whittle's murder, entitled The Black Panther, was released. Parts of the film were shot on location in Bathpool Park.

Bathpool Park is owned and managed by Newcastle-under-Lyme Borough Council.

References

Parks and open spaces in Staffordshire
Kidsgrove
Reservoirs in Staffordshire